The Roundhill Academy (formerly Roundhill Community College) is a co-educational secondary school located in Thurmaston, Leicestershire, England. The most recent Ofsted inspection report (January in 2023) identified the school as "needing improvement" or "inadequate" in every category.

The Roundhill Academy is a member of the Bradgate Education Partnership, a multi-academy trust.

References

Academies in Leicestershire
Borough of Charnwood
Secondary schools in Leicestershire